The One O'Clock News may refer to:

 ITN News at One (1976-1987, 1988-1991)
 BBC News at One (1986-present)
 RTÉ News: One O'Clock (1989-present)
 RTÉ News at One

See also
 Five O'Clock News (disambiguation)
 Six O'Clock News (disambiguation)
 Nine O'Clock News (disambiguation)
 News at Ten (disambiguation)